Pagolo Arsago (died 1563) was a member of the Goldsmith's Guild. He kept his shop in Rome by the beautiful sixteenth-century church of Saint Eligius, patron of goldsmiths. Benvenuto Cellini made some goldsmith designs under Pagolo Arsago.

References
Booknotes 'Benvenuto Cellini autobiography' published by Penguin Classics

Year of birth missing
1563 deaths
Italian artists
Italian goldsmiths